Heyuan is a railway station in the Dongbu Subdistrict, Yuancheng District, Heyuan City, Guangdong Province, China.

Stations on the Beijing–Kowloon Railway
Railway stations in Guangdong